Cambridge Consultants, part of Capgemini Invent, develops breakthrough products and services, creates and licenses intellectual property, and provides business consultancy in technology-critical issues for clients worldwide. The company has offices in Cambridge (UK), Boston (USA), Tokyo and Singapore, Cambridge Consultants offers solutions across a diverse range of industries including medical and life science, industrial and energy, consumer and retail, and communications and infrastructure. In 2021, Cambridge Consultants became part of Capgemini Invent.

History
Cambridge Consultants was founded in 1960 by three Cambridge University graduates – Tim Eiloart, Rodney Dale, and David Southward – to "put the brains of Cambridge University at the disposal of the problems of British industry".

Initially, the company was privately run. In 1971, it became part of Arthur D. Little (ADL), an American management consultancy firm. In 2002, following ADL's process through Chapter 11, Cambridge Consultants management team acquired the company with the backing of Altran, a global innovation and engineering consulting firm. 

In 2020, Altran itself was acquired by Capgemini, with Cambridge Consultants thus also coming under the ownership of the French consultancy conglomerate, under the "Capgemini Invent" umbrella.

Notable spin-outs
Cambridge Consultants has been described as the founder of the Cambridge Cluster and has spun out more than $1bn companies including:
 Alphamosaic
 Domino Printing Sciences
 Cambridge Silicon Radio
 Xaar

Innovations
Technology innovations include a drone delivery service, machine learning solutions, fitness-enhancing clothing, holographic radar and airborne antenna that will provide widescale 5G coverage.

References

Further reading
 Dale, Rodney (1979) From Ram Yard to Milton Hilton: A History of Cambridge Consultants Ltd, 1960–1979, 36 pp. Cambridge: Cambridge Consultants Ltd
 Dale, Rodney (2010) From Ram Yard to Milton Hilton: Cambridge Consultants - the early years, 120 pp. Haddenham, Cambridgeshire: Fern House Publishing, 

Consulting firms established in 1960
Companies based in Cambridge
Technology companies of the United Kingdom
1960 establishments in England
Technology companies established in 1960
British companies established in 1960
1960 establishments in the United Kingdom